Francesco Maselli or Citto Maselli (born 9 December 1930, in Rome) is an Italian film director and screenwriter. He has directed 38 films since 1949.

Biography
Maselli graduated at the National Film School in 1949 and began his career as assistant director for Luigi Chiarini, Michelangelo Antonioni and Luchino Visconti. Thanks to Visconti, Maselli manages to direct his first feature film, Abandoned, showed in competition at the 16th Venice Film Festival.

In the 1980s, Maselli dedicated himself to more intimate films, generally focused on female portraits, such as A Tale of Love, with which Maselli won the Grand Jury Prize at the 43rd Venice Film Festival, where Valeria Golino was awarded with her first Volpi Cup for Best Actress.

His 1990 film Il segreto was entered into the 40th Berlin International Film Festival.

Selected filmography

Director

Feature films

 L'amore in città (1953) (episode "Storia di Caterina")
 Cantamaggio a Cervarezza (1954, short film)
 Abandoned  (1955)
 La donna del giorno (1956)
 Silver Spoon Set (1960)
 Le italiane e l'amore (1961) (episode "Le adolescenti e l'amore")
 Gli indifferenti (1964)
 Kill Me Quick, I'm Cold (1967)
 A Fine Pair (1968)
 Lettera aperta a un giornale della sera (1970)
 The Suspect (1975)
 Tre operai (1980) (TV film)
 A Tale of Love (1986)
 Private Access (1988)
 L'alba (1990)
 The Secret (1990)
 Intolerance (1996) (episode "Pietas")
 Cronache del terzo millennio (1996)
 Il compagno (1999) (TV film)
 The Red Shadows (2009)

Documentaries

 Tibet proibito (1949)
 Bagnaia, villaggio italiano (1949)
 Finestre (1950)
 Zona pericolosa (1951)
 Stracciaroli (1951)
 Sport minore (1951)
 Bambini (1951)
 Ombrelli (1952)
 Uno spettacolo di pupi (1953)
 I fiori (1953)
 Festa dei morti in Sicilia (1953)
 Città che dorme (1953)
 Bambini al cinema (1956)
 Adolescenza (1959)
 La suola romana (1960)
 L'addio a Enrico Berlinguer (1984) (collective documentary)
 Un altro mondo è possibile (2001) (collective documentary)
 Lettere dalla Palestina (2002)
 Firenze, il nostro domani (2003)
 Frammenti di Novecento (2005)
 Civico zero (2007)

Actor
 Lettera aperta a un giornale della sera (1970) - Man from Beograd (uncredited)
 Amarcord (1973) - Bongioanni (uncredited)
 La terrazza (1980) - Himself
 And the Ship Sails On (1983) - Guardiano del rinoceronte (uncredited)
 The Name of the Rose (1986) - Schweinehirten #3
 Alfonso Sansone produttore per caso (2014) - Himself

 Awards and nominations 
Berlin Film Festival
1990: Nominated for the Golden Bear for The SecretDavid di Donatello Awards
1987: Nominated for the David di Donatello for Best Director for A Tale of Love1987: Nominated for the David di Donatello for Best Screenplay for A Tale of LoveVenice Film Festival
1955: Nominated for the Golden Lion for Abandoned1960: Nominated for the Golden Lion for Silver Spoon Set1986: Grand Jury Prize for A Tale of Love1986: Nominated for the Golden Lion for A Tale of Love''

References

External links
 

1930 births
Living people
Italian screenwriters
Italian male screenwriters
Italian film directors
Italian communists
Writers from Rome
Centro Sperimentale di Cinematografia alumni